William Stranger (27 October 1871 – 26 February 1945) was an Australian rules footballer who played with Collingwood in the Victorian Football League (VFL).

Notes

External links 

Bill Stranger's profile at Collingwood Forever

1871 births
1945 deaths
Australian rules footballers from Melbourne
Collingwood Football Club players
People from Brunswick, Victoria